Patrick James Ryan (20 January 1883 – 13 February 1964) was an Irish American hammer thrower. He competed for the United States at the 1920 Summer Olympics and won a gold medal in the hammer throw and a silver in the 56-pound weight throw. In 1913 he established the first world record in hammer throw, which stood as a world record for 25 years and as an American record for 40 years. Ryan was part of Irish weight throwers known as the Irish Whales.

Biography

Born in County Limerick, Ireland, Ryan won his first Irish hammer title in 1902, beating the great Tom Kiely. In 1910 Ryan emigrated to the United States of America. After placing third in the 1911 AAU championship in his first year he improved to take second place in 1912, and won the title in 1913. With the exception of 1918 when he was in Europe with the American Armed Forces he won the AAU title every year from then up to and including 1921, when he retired.

While in New York City Ryan worked  as a labor foreman with Consolidated Edison, Incorporated. He was a member of both the Irish American Athletic Club and the New York Athletic Club. He had not established citizenship in time for the 1912 Olympics in Stockholm, and so missed an opportunity. This remained a world record for 25 years and an American record for forty years, being eventually beaten by Martin Engel in July 1953.
 on 11 July 1953.

He also took a silver medal in the now discontinued event of throwing a 56 lb. weight for distance, the only time this event was held at the Olympics. In 1924 he returned to Ireland to take over the family farm and remained there until his death in 1964.

References

External links

 Winged Fist Organization
 Patrick J. Ryan in 'Sports People' file at Limerick City Library, Ireland

Sportspeople from County Limerick
Irish male hammer throwers
American male hammer throwers
Olympic gold medalists for the United States in track and field
Olympic silver medalists for the United States in track and field
Athletes (track and field) at the 1920 Summer Olympics
1881 births
1964 deaths
World record setters in athletics (track and field)
Male weight throwers
Medalists at the 1920 Summer Olympics
Irish emigrants to the United States (before 1923)
Olympic weight throwers